Thaayin Manikodi is a 1998 Indian Tamil-language action drama film written and directed by Arjun, who also starred in the lead role. It stars him alongside an ensemble cast including Tabu and Nivedita Jain. The film narrates the tale of a sincere police officer who thwarts the plans of a major terrorist by saving some highly confidential documents from falling into the wrong hands. Featuring music by Vidyasagar, the film began production in late 1997 and was released on 29 August 1998.

Cast

Arjun as Arjun
Tabu as Anjali
Nivedita Jain as Asha
Vijayakumar
Goundamani as Shilpa Kumar
Chandrasekhar
Vennira Aadai Moorthy
Charle
Chinni Jayanth
Sowcar Janaki
Annapoorna
Rallapalli
Naren as Politician
Baby Shamili as Rosie
Baby Jennifer
Rajesh Babu
Baby Annie
Alphonsa in a special appearance

Production
The film was first announced in January 1996, with director and lead actor Arjun initially casting Vijayashanti in a leading role. However the actress later left the project after she had creative differences with the film's producer, Sudhakar Raju. The film began production in October 1996 and took over a year to complete. Hindi actress Tabu and model Nivedita Jain were cast in key roles, with the latter subsequently making her debut in Tamil films. The film was named after a popular song from Arjun's previous film, Jai Hind (1994), which had a similar patriotic theme.

The film was shot extensively in foreign locations, with scenes filmed in locations in Hong Kong and Switzerland, which the team had to settle for after their visas for Canada were rejected. Further scenes were also shot in Madanapalle, Andhra Pradesh, with art director Thotta Tharani constructing sets for the film. Production was delayed as a result of the FEFSI strike of 1997.

Soundtrack

The soundtrack features 6 songs composed by Vidyasagar.

Release
The film was initially scheduled to release in November 1997 coinciding with the Diwali season, but was subsequently put on hold for several months. The film was later released in August 1998, with the title card of the film including a tribute to the film's lead actress Nivedita Jain, who died before the film's release. The film received a good commercial response at the box office.

Four years after the original release, the film was later dubbed and released in Telugu during November 2002 as Jaatiya Pattaakam.

References

1998 films
1990s Tamil-language films
Films about terrorism in India
Films directed by Arjun Sarja
Films scored by Vidyasagar
Fictional portrayals of the Tamil Nadu Police
Indian action films
1998 action films